

Key

Coaches

Notes

References

National Football League head coaches